On May 25, 2020, a confrontation occurred between Christian Cooper (a Black birder) and unrelated Amy Cooper (a white dogwalker) in a section of New York City's Central Park known as the Ramble.

Amy's dog was unleashed in the Ramble, an area where leashing is required for the safety of the wildlife; she allegedly refused Christian's request that her dog be leashed. When Christian beckoned the dog toward him with a dog treat, Amy yelled "Don't you touch my dog!" Christian started recording Amy, who placed a call to 9-1-1, telling them "There is an African American man—I am in Central Park—he is recording me and threatening myself and my dog. Please, send the cops immediately!" By the time New York City Police Department officers responded, both parties had left.

The incident received wide publicity when a video of part of the incident went viral in the hours following the event. On July 6, 2020, the Manhattan District Attorney announced that Amy Cooper had been charged with filing a false police report, a misdemeanor with a penalty of up to one year in jail.  She was arraigned on October 14. The charges against her were dropped in February 2021 after she completed an educational course.

The incident happened the same day as the arrest and murder of George Floyd. Both incidents gained nearly instant media coverage due to video recordings being shared across social media.

Incident 
On the morning of May 25, 2020, a woman named Amy Cooper was walking her dog in an area of Central Park known as the Ramble. Comic book writer and editor Christian Cooper was birdwatching there, and noticed that Amy's dog was unleashed and running free, despite the requirement that dogs in that part of the park be on-leash according to the Central Park Conservancy, which manages the park under contract with the city. Christian asked Amy to leash her dog, and she allegedly refused. By his own account, Christian then said, "Look, if you're going to do what you want, I'm going to do what I want, but you're not going to like it", and beckoned the dog toward him with a dog treat. Amy then yelled, "Don't you touch my dog!" Christian then began recording on his cellphone.

Christian Cooper's video begins with Amy Cooper approaching him asking him to stop recording and pointing her finger in his face. He says to her: "Please, don't come close to me." She then says to Christian: "I'm calling the cops... I'm gonna tell them there's an African American man threatening my life." She then pulls out her phone and begins calling the police and, when connected to the 9-1-1 operator, she tells the operator that "There is an African American man—I am in Central Park—he is recording me and threatening myself and my dog. Please, send the cops immediately!" The video ends with Christian telling her "thank you", the moment she leashes the dog. Police said that by the time they responded, both individuals had left.

The New York Times reported in October 2020 that Amy had made a second 9-1-1 call against Christian, in which she alleged that Christian had tried to assault her. However, the Times later made a correction, saying that the second call was when a 9-1-1 dispatcher called her back. The existence of the second 9-1-1 call was not reported by the media at the time of the incident.

Reaction 
Christian Cooper's sister posted the video on her Twitter account, while Christian posted the video to his own Facebook page. The Twitter video alone received over 40 million views. Amy Cooper's actions in the video were widely criticized. She was accused of falsely presenting herself as being in immediate physical danger, in the context of the "tendency for people and police to treat black people with suspicion". In the video, Amy was seen dragging her dog, a cocker spaniel, by its collar. On May 25, she surrendered the dog to the shelter from which she had adopted him two years before. On June 3, after an evaluation by the shelter's veterinarian, the dog was returned to her.

After viewing the video that day, Amy's employer, Franklin Templeton, placed her on administrative leave pending an investigation. The following day the company fired her from her job as head of the firm's insurance investment.

In a Facebook commentary, television host Trevor Noah said that the confrontation between the two Coopers was an example of how white and black Americans see, and are seen by, the police differently. He said that this event being captured on video meant that viewers could perceive Amy Cooper's actions as deliberate, and verifying the police's unequal treatment of people of different races.

The August 3, 2021, episode of the podcast Honestly with Bari Weiss—entitled The Real Story of "The Central Park Karen"—described the incident, and suggested that the original media reports were biased against Amy Cooper. On the podcast, Amy claimed that Christian's actions had made her feel threatened, saying: "I don't know that as a woman alone in a park that I had another option" other than calling 9-1-1. She also said she had received death threats and was doxxed, causing her to feel suicidal and forcing her to leave the United States.

Legislation 
In 2018, legislation was first proposed in the New York State Assembly by assemblyman Félix W. Ortiz that would consider falsely reporting criminal incidents against protected groups of people—including race, gender, and religion—to be a hate crime. Violators could face prison time "if the motivation for reporting such crime is motivated by a perception or belief about their race, color, national origin, ancestry, gender, religion, religious practice, age, disability or sexual orientation". The bill was re-introduced in the Assembly by Ortiz with four co-sponsors and in the New York State Senate by Senator Brian Benjamin in May 2020 in the wake of the Central Park incident. It was subsequently supported by Governor Andrew Cuomo as part of a set of other proposals related to police reform for the 2020 New York legislative session, and he signed it into law in June 2020.

Legal proceedings 
During the week of the incident, the New York City Commission on Human Rights launched an investigation of the interaction, and sent a letter to Amy Cooper requesting her cooperation. The commission has the power to fine violators of the law, award financial damages to victims, order training on the New York City Human Rights Law, and order community service.

The Central Park Civic Association asked New York City Mayor Bill de Blasio to ban Amy Cooper from the park. On July 6, 2020, the Manhattan District Attorney (DA), Cyrus Vance Jr., announced that Amy Cooper had been issued a desk appearance ticket (an order to appear in New York City Criminal Court) and charged with filing a false police report, a misdemeanor with a maximum penalty of up to one year in jail; lesser sentences could include community service or counseling.  She was scheduled for arraignment on October 14. The Manhattan DA said in a statement: "We are strongly committed to holding perpetrators of this conduct accountable". In a New York Times article published on July 7, 2020, Christian Cooper was quoted as saying that he is not cooperating with the Manhattan DA's investigation, stating that "Bringing her more misery just seems like piling on." The following week he expanded on his feelings in a Washington Post op-ed piece, saying he was ambivalent about prosecuting her because "I think it’s a mistake to focus on this one individual. The important thing the incident highlights is the long-standing, deep-seated racial bias against us black and brown folk that permeates the United States."

In October 2020, during a court appearance for Amy Cooper, the New York County District Attorney's prosecutors revealed there was a second 9-1-1 call made by a 9-1-1 dispatcher who called Amy Cooper back. This court appearance was the first time the existence of the second 9-1-1 call had been made public. Amy Cooper was in court facing charges of filing a false report, which is punishable by up to one year in jail. In February 2021, charges against Amy Cooper were dropped after she completed a five-session educational and therapeutic program focused on racial identity.

On May 25, 2021, Amy Cooper sued Franklin Templeton for wrongful termination. She claimed the firing had violated several anti-discrimination and defamation laws. Amy Cooper's lawsuit characterized Christian Cooper as "a birdwatcher with a history of aggressively confronting dog owners in Central Park who walked their dogs without a leash. It was Christian Cooper's practice and intent to cause dog owners to be fearful for their safety and the safety of their dogs..." Franklin Templeton said "We believe... the company responded appropriately. We will defend against these baseless claims." In August 2021, the company requested that the lawsuit be dismissed. On September 23, 2022, Amy Cooper lost her lawsuit of wrongful termination against Franklin Templeton.

See also 

 Black Birders Week
 Karen (slang)
 Race card
 Selective enforcement
 Woman card

References

Further reading 
 

2020 controversies in the United States
2020 in New York City
Birdwatching
Central Park
History of racism in New York (state)
May 2020 events in the United States
Race-related controversies in the United States